Traveller Supplement 9: Fighting Ships is a tabletop role-playing game supplement, written by Tim Brown, with illustrations by Jennell Jaquays, for Traveller and published in 1981 by Game Designers' Workshop. Fighting Ships presents 25 different ships in use by the Imperium, ranging from a 20-ton gig to a 500,000-ton dreadnought. The supplement uses the rules and combat systems from a previous supplement, High Guard. Each ship class is presented with statistics, component descriptions, and a bit of background. Thirteen Traveller supplements were published. A single collected volume was published by Far Future Enterprises in 2000.

Reception
In the December 1981 edition of The Space Gamer (Issue No. 46), William A. Barton gave a thumbs up, saying, "Fighting Ships is well worth adding to your Traveller collection." 

However, in the December 1981 edition of Dragon (Issue 56), although Tony Watson called the supplement "very interesting reading for those of us enamored with spaceships and all that goes with them", he questioned why players or referees would buy the book. "It is highly unlikely that any player character is going to acquire a ship of this great size and capability."

See also
Classic Traveller Supplements

Notes

References

Role-playing game supplements introduced in 1981
Traveller (role-playing game) supplements